The women's 100 metre backstroke event at the 1956 Olympic Games took place on 5 December. This swimming event used backstroke. Twenty-three swimmers from 14 countries competed in this swimming event. Because an Olympic-size swimming pool is 50 metres long, this race consisted of two lengths of the pool. This was the seventh time that there had been the women's 100-metre backstroke after its debut in the 1924 Paris Olympics.

Medalists

Results

Heats
Eight fastest swimmers advanced to the finals.

Heat 1

Heat 2

Heat 3

Final

Key: WR = World record

References

External links
Women 100m Backstroke Swimming Olympic Games 1956 Melbourne (AUS)

Women's backstroke 100 metre
1956 in women's swimming
Women's events at the 1956 Summer Olympics